is a passenger railway station in located in the town of Kihoku, Kitamuro District, Mie Prefecture, Japan, operated by Central Japan Railway Company (JR Tōkai).

Lines

Station layout
The station consists of a single side platform and a single island platform serving three tracks, connected to the station building by a footbridge. The wooden station building dates from the original construction. The station is attended.

Platforms

History 
Kii-Nagashima Station opened on 29 April 1930 on the Japanese Government Railways (JGR) Kisei East Line. The line was extended to Minose Station by 26 April 1932, and the JGR became the Japan National Railways (JNR) after World War II. The line was renamed the Kisei Main Line on 15 July 1959. The station was absorbed into the JR Central network upon the privatization of the JNR on 1 April 1987.

Passenger statistics
In fiscal 2019, the station was used by an average of 217 passengers daily (boarding passengers only).

Surrounding area
Kihoku Town Office 
Kihoku Municipal Kihoku Junior High School
Kihoku Municipal Higashi Elementary School

See also
List of railway stations in Japan

References

External links

 JR Central timetable 
JR Central official home page

Railway stations in Japan opened in 1930
Railway stations in Mie Prefecture
Kihoku, Mie